Lutful Hai Sachchu was a Bangladesh Awami League politician and Member of Parliament from Brahmanbaria-3.

Career
Sachchu served in the Bangladesh Liberation war as an advisor to Mukti Bahini forces in Sectors two and three. was elected to Parliament in 2008 from Brahmanbaria-3 as a Bangladesh Awami League candidate. He was a Member of the parliamentary standing committee on commerce ministry.

Death
Sachchu died on 22 November 2010 in his home in Gulshan Thana, Dhaka, from a cardiac arrest.

References

Awami League politicians
2010 deaths
10th Jatiya Sangsad members
Mukti Bahini personnel
Year of birth missing